Ali Akbar Ahaki (born April 3, 1993) is an Iranian football goalkeeper who plays for Esteghlal Khuzestan.

Club career

Esteghlal Khuzestan
He made his debut for Esteghlal Khuzestan in the 20th fixture of 2013–14 Iran Pro League against Naft Tehran while he substituted in for Fábio Carvalho.

Honours 
Esteghlal Khuzestan
Iran Pro League (1): 2015–16
Iranian Super Cup runner-up: 2016

References

1993 births
Living people
Esteghlal Khuzestan players
Iranian footballers
People from Ahvaz
Association football goalkeepers
Sportspeople from Khuzestan province